Herb Drinkwater (1936 – December 28, 1997) was an American politician from the state of Arizona. Herbert Raymond Drinkwater, was the oldest child of Herbert Drinkwater (1909-1992) and Alice Estella Bumstead (1913-1987). His father was born in England, his mother in New York, where they married and had their first child: Herbert. After World War II, the family moved to Phoenix where Herbert Sr was a high school math teacher.

Herbert Raymond Drinkwater was mayor of Scottsdale from 1980 to 1996, when he was diagnosed with salivary gland cancer.

Personal
One of Drinkwater's sons, Mark Drinkwater, used to own Drinkwater's City Hall Restaurant at the Scottsdale Airport in Scottsdale.

Legacy
The city of Scottsdale has a boulevard named after him; a statue of Drinkwater was built at the boulevard. The statue was dedicated on May 10, 2003.

References

1936 births
1997 deaths
Mayors of places in Arizona
Politicians from Scottsdale, Arizona
20th-century American politicians